Solomon Abudarham (died 1804) was Chief Rabbi of the British Overseas Territory of Gibraltar until his death from yellow fever in December 1804. Also known as Shelomo Abudarham II, the rabbi established a school of religious study on Parliament Lane and laid the inaugural stone for the Flemish Synagogue on Line Wall Road. In 1820, his academy was converted into the Abudarham Synagogue, named after the rabbi.

Biography

Solomon Abudarham, also known as Shelomo Abudarham II, was the grandson of Shelomo Abudarham I of Tétouan, Morocco. It is also probable that he is the descendant of the Spanish Rabbi David Abudarham, author of Sefer Abudarham.  The younger Abudarham immigrated to the British Overseas Territory of Gibraltar from Morocco in 1790, prompted by the reign of terror which began when the Muslim Mawlay al-Yazid became Sultan of Morocco following the death of Sidi Muhammad ben Abdallah that year. Abudarham succeeded Rabbi Yehuda ben Yitshak Halevi as Chief Rabbi of Gibraltar.

The late 18th century was a time of prosperity for Gibraltar's merchants due to the French Revolutionary Wars. At the same time, some of the congregants of the Great Synagogue on Engineer Lane had reservations about the trend toward a less formal, more Moroccan style of service at their house of worship. They opted to build a new, lavish synagogue on Line Wall Road, with a service that would be more in-keeping with that of the Portuguese Synagogue in Amsterdam, Netherlands. The new synagogue was built in a garden for a total of US$26,300 and closely resembled the Amsterdam synagogue. It was entitled Nefusot Yehudah (The Dwelling of Judah), but is more commonly known as the Flemish Synagogue. It was founded at the turn of the 19th century, in 1799 or 1800. Chief Rabbi Abudarham laid the inaugural stone which bears his name and is still present at the site. He also established a Bet Medrash (School of Jewish religious study), the Academy of Rabbi Solomon Abudarham, on Parliament Lane.

Chief Rabbi Solomon Abudarham died in the 1804 yellow fever epidemic which claimed more than a thousand lives in Gibraltar. He was interred in Jews' Gate Cemetery on Windmill Hill near the southern entrance to the Upper Rock Nature Reserve. His grave rests in an enclosure which also surrounds the tombs of other Dayanim (Judges of Religious Law). His tomb is the oldest of the six Dayanim in the enclosure. The rabbi's inscription reads:

Legacy

Other than an 1802 decision which dealt with the exemption of Torah scholars from the payment of taxes, fairly little of the rabbi's writings survive. In the early nineteenth century, recent Moroccan immigrants to Gibraltar expressed their desire for a synagogue that was more intimate in scale and less formal than the Great Synagogue. In 1820, the school of religious study that Abudarham had established was converted into a synagogue, the Abudarham Synagogue. The building on Parliament Lane had formerly been used as the Freemasons' Hall. As a consequence, Parliament Lane is sometimes referred to in Spanish as El Callejón de los Masones (Freemasons' Street). It is speculated that the building housed the municipal council when Gibraltar was in the possession of the Spanish. Both the Flemish Synagogue and the Abudarham Synagogue continue to be active houses of worship for Gibraltar's Jewish community.

References

External links 
 Photographs of Jews' Gate Cemetery 

Gibraltarian rabbis
Chief rabbis
1804 deaths
Moroccan people of Spanish-Jewish descent
18th-century Moroccan rabbis
People from Tétouan
Gibraltarian Sephardi Jews
Year of birth unknown
British people of Spanish-Jewish descent